Urophora spatiosa is a species of tephritid or fruit flies in the genus Urophora of the family Tephritidae.

Distribution
Iran, Uzbekistan

References

Urophora
Insects described in 1913
Taxa named by Theodor Becker
Diptera of Asia